<noinclude>
Queen's Theatre or Queen's Theater may refer to:

United Kingdom

Existing theatres
 Sondheim Theatre, formerly the Queen's Theatre prior to 2020, a West End theatre in Shaftesbury Avenue, London
 Queen's Theatre, Hornchurch, London 
 Queen's Theatre, Barnstaple, Devon
 Her Majesty's Theatre, London, founded as the Queen's Theatre in 1705, also known as Queen's Theatre at the Haymarket 
 Scala Theatre, London, known at times in the 1800s as the Queen's Theatre

Defunct theatres
 Queen's Theatre, Long Acre, London, 1867–1878
 Dorset Garden Theatre, London, built in 1671, later the Queen's Theatre
 Queen's Theatre, Longton, Staffordshire, built in 1896, later the Empire Theatre, Longton

Other countries
 Queen's Theatre, Adelaide, Australia, 1840–1842, reopened 1996
 Nostalgic Queen's Theatre, Wallumbilla, Queensland, Australia, opened 1939
 Queens Theatre in the Park, Queens, New York City, U.S.
 Queen's Theatre, Hong Kong
 Queen's Theatre, Dublin, Ireland, 1844-1969
 Queen's Theater (Liberia)

See also
Queen's Hall in London, destroyed in the Blitz
Queen's Hall (disambiguation), other theatres with that name

Lists of theatres